Juan Pablo Añor Acosta (born 24 January 1994), commonly known as Juanpi, is a Venezuelan footballer who plays for Super League Greece club Panetolikos as an attacking midfielder.

He played 146 games and scored 11 goals for Málaga in Spain, in four La Liga seasons and three in Segunda División, while also playing on loan in the top flight for Huesca. He represented Venezuela at the Copa América in 2016 and 2019.

Club career
Born in Caracas, Juanpi joined Málaga CF's youth system in 2009, aged 15, from hometown club Caracas FC. He spent several seasons in the Juvenil squad, and was promoted to the reserves in the 2013–14 campaign, appearing regularly in Tercera División.

Juanpi made his first-team – and La Liga – debut on 29 August 2014, replacing Luis Alberto in the 75th minute of a 0–3 loss at Valencia CF. On 19 December he signed a new contract until 2018, and scored his first professional goal on 6 January of the following year, netting the first in a 2−0 Copa del Rey home win against Levante UD.

Juanpi scored his first league goal on 23 January 2016, netting the equalizer in a 1–2 home loss against FC Barcelona. Seven days later he added another, netting the first in a 2–1 win at SD Eibar, and scored four goals during the campaign.

Juanpi switched from 28 to  10 shirt ahead of the 2016–17 campaign, and scored the Andalusians' first goal of the competition, in a 1–1 home draw against CA Osasuna.

On 31 January 2019, Juanpi was loaned to SD Huesca in the top tier, until June. He was released by Málaga on 3 October of the following year, along with seven other first team players, due to a layoff.

On 11 October 2020, Juanpi was signed to Al-Ain FC in the Saudi Professional League. He returned to Caracas FC on 27 June 2022.

International career
After appearing with the under-17 team at the 2011 South American Under-17 Championship, Juanpi was also a part of the squad selected for the 2013 South American Youth Championship, hosted in Argentina. On 29 January 2013 he was also called up to the main squad.

Juanpi made his full international debut on 14 November 2014, replacing Frank Feltscher in the 58th minute of a 0–5 loss against Chile at the Estadio CAP in Talcahuano. He played one game for the Vinotinto at the Copa América Centenario in the United States, as a substitute in the 4–1 quarter-final loss to Argentina, and on 6 September 2016 he scored his first international goal to open a 2–2 home draw with the same opponent in 2018 FIFA World Cup qualification.

Juanpi was also called up for the 2019 Copa América in Brazil. He played one match, a 3–1 win over Bolivia in Belo Horizonte that advanced the team to the quarter-finals.

Personal life
Juanpi's father, Bernardo Añor, was also a footballer, as was his older brother, also named Bernardo. All three relatives played for Caracas.

Career statistics

Club
Accurate as of 6 April 2017

International goals

|-
| 1. || 6 September 2016 || Estadio Metropolitano de Mérida, Mérida, Venezuela ||  || 1–0 || 2–2 || 2018 World Cup qualification ||
|}

References

External links

Málaga official profile 

1994 births
Living people
Footballers from Caracas
Venezuelan footballers
Association football midfielders
La Liga players
Tercera División players
Saudi Professional League players
Venezuelan Primera División players
Atlético Malagueño players
Málaga CF players
SD Huesca footballers
Al-Ain FC (Saudi Arabia) players
Caracas FC players
Venezuela under-20 international footballers
Venezuela international footballers
Venezuelan expatriate footballers
Venezuelan expatriate sportspeople in Spain
Venezuelan expatriate sportspeople in Saudi Arabia
Expatriate footballers in Spain
Expatriate footballers in Saudi Arabia
Copa América Centenario players
2019 Copa América players